Musas: Un Homenaje al Folclore Latinoamericano en Manos de Los Macorinos, Vol 2 (English: "Muses: An Homage to Latin American Folklore in the Hands of Los Macorinos, Volume 2"), shortened to Musas, Vol. 2 ("Muses, Vol. 2"), is the seventh studio album by Mexican recording artist Natalia Lafourcade and the second in collaboration with the acoustic guitar duo Los Macorinos. It was released on February 9, 2018.

Musas, Vol. 2 received a Latin Grammy nomination for Album of the Year at the 19th Annual Latin Grammy Awards in 2018. The recording has also garnered a nomination for a Grammy Award for Best Latin Pop Album at the 61st Annual Grammy Awards in 2019.

Background
After the release of Musas and her participation on the animated film Coco, Lafourcade began working on the second part of the project. This album takes most of its structure from the first volume, including the sound and the appearance of original songs and classics from the Latin American music. The album includes the song "Un derecho de nacimiento", a song that was already released in 2012 and was originally written for the movement "Yo Soy 132".

Singles
"Danza de Gardenias" was released as the lead single of the album on January 12, 2018.

Reception 
Musas, Vol. 2 received a Latin Grammy nomination for Album of the Year at the 19th Annual Latin Grammy Awards in 2018. The recording has also garnered a nomination for a Grammy Award for Best Latin Pop Album at the 61st Annual Grammy Awards in 2019. Lafourcade performed "La Llorona" at the pre-telecast ceremony with fellow Mexican singers, Ángela Aguilar and Aida Cuevas.

Track listing
All tracks are produced by Gustavo Guerrero and Cheche Alara, except where noted.

Charts

Weekly charts

Year-end charts

See also
 2018 in Latin music

References

2018 albums
Natalia Lafourcade albums
Sony Music Mexico albums
Spanish-language albums
Latin Grammy Award for Best Folkloric Album
Sequel albums